Acassuso is a locality in the San Isidro "partido" of Buenos Aires Province. It is about 16 kilometres north of the city of Buenos Aires, between Olivos and San Isidro. It borders on the River Plate where an approximately 10 hectare municipal nature reserve "Refugio Natural Educativo de la Ribera Norte" exists since 1994. It is served by two commuter train services, the Tren de la Costa tourist line and the Mitre line.

Sport
Club Atlético Acassuso: Football club

Notable people
 Francis Mallmann, Argentine celebrity chef, author and restaurateur

External links
 History of Acassuso

Populated places in Buenos Aires Province
San Isidro Partido